Obey is a surname. Notable people with the surname include:

André Obey (1892–1975), French playwright and writer
Dave Obey (born 1938), American lobbyist and politician
Ebenezer Obey (born 1942), Nigerian musician
Pattie Obey, American choreographer
Wallace Obey (born 1961), Liberian sprinter